Ittihad El Shorta, also known as Police Union, or simply  El Shorta, is an Egyptian football club based in Cairo, Egypt. The club plays in the Egyptian Third Division, the third-highest league in the Egyptian football league system.

Current squad

Managers
 Talaat Youssef (July 1, 2008 – July 11, 2011)
 Helmy Toulan (July 21, 2011 – June 20, 2012)
 Mohamed Helmy (June 25, 2012 – July 24, 2013)
 Khaled El-Kammash

External links
Current logo

 
2005 establishments in Egypt
Association football clubs established in 2005
Egyptian Second Division
Football clubs in Cairo